Tazaungmon (also spelt Tazaungmone) is the eighth month of the traditional Burmese calendar.

Festivals and observances
Kahtein (Thadingyut - Tazaungmon)
Full moon of Tazaungmon
Tazaungdaing Festival of Lights
Matho Thingan Robe Weaving Festival (Yangon)
Founding of Taungoo (16 October 1510)
Fire Balloon Festival (Taunggyi, Shan State)
Intha Day

Tazaungmon symbols
Flower: Luffa acutangula

References

See also
Burmese calendar
Festivals of Burma

Months of the Burmese calendar